Warren C. Brown is Professor of History at the California Institute of Technology. His research relates to the social history of early Medieval Europe, conflict resolution and social and institutional memory. He is the editor of the Medieval World Series published by Routledge.

Education
1997 Ph.D., Medieval History, University of California, Los Angeles 1993 M.A., History, University of Cincinnati
1985 B.S., Physics, Tufts University
1985 B.M., French Horn Performance, New England Conservatory

Selected publications
Unjust Seizure: Conflict, Interest, and Authority in an Early Medieval Society, Cornell University Press, 2001.
Conflict in Medieval Europe: Changing Perspectives on Society and Culture, Ashgate, 2003 (with Piotr Górecki).
Violence in Medieval Europe, Longman, 2011.
Documentary Culture and the Laity in the Early Middle Ages, Cambridge University Press, Cambridge, 2013 (with Marios Costambeys, Matthew Innes and Adam J. Kosto).

References 

21st-century American historians
21st-century American male writers
Tufts University School of Arts and Sciences alumni
University of Cincinnati alumni
California Institute of Technology faculty
American male non-fiction writers
Living people
Year of birth missing (living people)
New England Conservatory alumni